Radio Romeo was a rock band from Los Angeles, California founded in 2006 by Basil Holly (Bombs, Belladonna, Whipsmack!) and Guy Hoffman (of the Violent Femmes and founder of the Bodeans eponymously-titled debut album RADIO ROMEO was produced by the legendary Andy Johns (The Rolling Stones, Led Zeppelin, Jimi Hendrix, Van Halen, et al.) and engineered by Brandon Henegar in 2007.

Band members

Basil Holly - Vocals, Multi-instrumentalist (Guitars, Pianos, Keyboards, Harmonicas, etc.)
Guy Hoffman - Percussion, Vocals
Brian Spangenberg - Bass, Vocals
Brandon Henegar - Guitars

Guest Players

Brian "Damage" Forsythe - (KIX, Rhino Bucket) Lead Guitars
Dave Shulz - (Goo Goo Dolls, English Beat) Piano, Keyboards
Jeremy White - (The Blessings) Harmonica
Jinxx - (The Dreaming) Violin, Violas

Musical Genre & Influences

Radio Romeo's sound can best be described as "Eclectic Classic Rock & Roll" since their musical repertoire references the catchy Pop melodies of the early 1970s while blending those with the Hard Rock guitar-driven music of the late 1980s "Sunset Strip-era". Radio Romeo differentiated their sound by peppering the hooks in their original material with Delta Blues riffs similarly and in the manner that these were used so successfully by The Rolling Stones decades earlier. 

RADIO ROMEO: Primary Musical Influences
This unique musical twist was not lost on the legendary Music Producer Andy Johns who'd produced the greatest albums of music ever released by The Rolling Stones including the hallowed "Sticky Fingers" and "Exile on Main Street" in the 1970s and much of that band's other work during that notable period. 

RADIO ROMEO: Additional Musical Influences
Additionally, the band's repertoire on their eponymously titled debut album 'Radio Romeo' was influenced by some of the more notable recording artists of the 1950s, 60's and 70's which also included The Who, David Bowie, AC/DC, Ramones, Bryan Ferry, Buddy Holly, Robert Johnson, Muddy Waters, Otis Redding and Sam Cook. 

Songs by Radio Romeo and produced by Andy Johns, may be heard and/or downloaded here: http://www.reverbnation.com/radioromeo

Songs on the Album 'Radio Romeo' (2007)   

 1.  King of the Night (1995 B. Holly)    
 2.  Like a Lion (1995 B. Holly)
 3.  Let's Run Away (1995 B. Holly)
 4.  Strapped on the Wheel (1976 B. Holly)
 5.  She's My Idol (1977 B. Holly)
 6.  Diamond Ring (1977 B. Holly)
 7.  Round 'n Round (2001 B. Henegar / B. Holly)
 8.  Seven Sins of Love (1986 B. Holly)
 9.  Decisions (1994 B. Holly)
 10. In Dreams (G. Hoffman)

External links
 Band Website 

Rock music groups from California
Musical groups from Los Angeles